Mike Hayley is a British actor, comedian, impressionist and writer. He starred alongside Susie Blake, Caroline Leddy, James Gaddas, Mike Doyle (comedian) in the BBC's sketch show, Something for the Weekend (1989) and Shane Richie, David Schneider (actor), Suzy Aitchison, Frances Dodge, & Lewis MacLeod (actor) in Up to Something (1990).

He and Alan Francis wrote the play Jeffrey Dahmer is Unwell, taking it to the Edinburgh Festival in 1995. He also co-presented the Emotional Collection at the Gilded Balloon with Rhona Cameron at the Edinburgh Festival before this.

He provided the voice of Colonel White in the CGI remake of Gerry Anderson's New Captain Scarlet and has had minor roles in several big budget films, including the 2000 film 102 Dalmatians, directed by Kevin Lima as well as small budget films like 'The End of the World' where he plays a man who causes the apocalypse. He has written material for Jasper Carrot. He also voiced Chopper in the video game, Clock Tower 3.

Hayley is one of the regular performers at Jongleurs, a stand up comedy club in London.

References

Sources 
 
Whatsonstage.com: http://www.whatsonstage.com/dl/page.php?page=details&id=L132356246

Living people
20th-century British comedians
20th-century British male actors
21st-century British comedians
21st-century British male actors
British male actors
British male comedians
Year of birth missing (living people)